Donatas Vencevičius (born 28 November 1973 in Lithuanian SSR, Soviet Union) is a Lithuanian football coach and former midfielder, who is currently an assistant coach of Wigry Suwałki.

Vencevičius started his career at Žalgiris Vilnius. In 2001, while playing for FC København, he became champion of the Danish Superliga. In 2002, he played for the Norwegian club IK Start. Donatas also made a mediocre stay in the Swedish club GIF Sundsvall during the season 2005.

He started his manager career in 2007 after announcing his retirement from professional football as a player and was first assistant, then head coach FK Vėtra in one season before moving to FK Sūduva in 2009 to take up an assistant coach position. Before 2010 season Sūduva appointed Vencevičius as the head coach.

On 24 May 2011 he was named new manager of II liga club Wigry Suwałki.

On 14 December 2016 he signed a two-year contract with Lithuanian A Lyga club Jonava.

Since 2009 Vencevičius has been an assistant coach of the Lithuanian national team.

Honours

FK Žalgiris Vilnius
A Lyga: 1991–92
Lithuanian Cup: 1991, 1992–93, 1993–94, 1996–97

Polonia Warszawa
Ekstraklasa: 1999–00

F.C. Copenhagen
Superliga: 2000–01

International goals

References

External links
 
 

1973 births
Living people
Lithuanian footballers
Lithuania international footballers
FK Žalgiris players
FC Vilnius players
Polonia Warsaw players
F.C. Copenhagen players
Marsaxlokk F.C. players
GIF Sundsvall players
IK Start players
A Lyga players
Ekstraklasa players
Danish Superliga players
Allsvenskan players
Expatriate men's footballers in Denmark
Expatriate footballers in Malta
Expatriate footballers in Poland
Lithuanian expatriate sportspeople in Poland
Sportspeople from Alytus
Association football midfielders
Lithuanian football managers
FK Sūduva Marijampolė managers
Lithuanian expatriate football managers
FK Jonava managers
Wigry Suwałki managers
II liga managers